In category theory, the product of two (or more) objects in a category is a notion designed to capture the essence behind constructions in other areas of mathematics such as the Cartesian product of sets, the direct product of groups or rings, and the product of topological spaces. Essentially, the product of a family of objects is the "most general" object which admits a morphism to each of the given objects.

Definition

Product of two objects

 For every object  and every pair of morphisms   there exists a unique morphism  such that the following diagram commutes:

Product of an arbitrary family

Instead of two objects, we can start with an arbitrary family of objects indexed by a set 

Given a family  of objects, a product of the family is an object  equipped with morphisms  satisfying the following universal property: 
For every object  and every -indexed family of morphisms  there exists a unique morphism  such that the following diagrams commute for all 

The product is denoted  If  then it is denoted  and the product of morphisms is denoted

Equational definition

Alternatively, the product may be defined through equations. So, for example, for the binary product:
 Commutativity of the diagrams above is guaranteed by the equality: for all  and all  

As a limit

The product is a special case of a limit. This may be seen by using a discrete category (a family of objects without any morphisms, other than their identity morphisms) as the diagram required for the definition of the limit. The discrete objects will serve as the index of the components and projections.  If we regard this diagram as a functor, it is a functor from the index set  considered as a discrete category. The definition of the product then coincides with the definition of the limit,  being a cone and projections being the limit (limiting cone).

Universal property

Just as the limit is a special case of the universal construction, so is the product.

Examples
In the category of sets, the product (in the category theoretic sense) is the Cartesian product. Given a family of sets  the product is defined as

with the canonical projections

Given any set  with a family of functions  
the universal arrow  is defined by 

Other examples:
 In the category of topological spaces, the product is the space whose underlying set is the Cartesian product and which carries the product topology. The product topology is the coarsest topology for which all the projections are continuous.
 In the category of modules over some ring  the product is the Cartesian product with addition defined componentwise and distributive multiplication.
 In the category of groups, the product is the direct product of groups given by the Cartesian product with multiplication defined componentwise.
 In the category of graphs, the product is the tensor product of graphs.
 In the category of relations, the product is given by the disjoint union. (This may come as a bit of a surprise given that the category of sets is a subcategory of the category of relations.)
 In the category of algebraic varieties, the product is given by the Segre embedding.
 In the category of semi-abelian monoids, the product is given by the history monoid.
 In the category of Banach spaces and short maps, the product carries the  norm.  
 A partially ordered set can be treated as a category, using the order relation as the morphisms.  In this case the products and coproducts correspond to greatest lower bounds (meets) and least upper bounds (joins).

Discussion

An example in which the product does not exist: In the category of fields, the product  does not exist, since there is no field with homomorphisms to both  and 

Another example: An empty product (that is,  is the empty set) is the same as a terminal object, and some categories, such as the category of infinite groups, do not have a terminal object: given any infinite group  there are infinitely many morphisms  so  cannot be terminal.

If  is a set such that all products for families indexed with  exist, then one can treat each product as a functor  How this functor maps objects is obvious. Mapping of morphisms is subtle, because the product of morphisms defined above does not fit. First, consider the binary product functor, which is a bifunctor. For  we should find a morphism  We choose  This operation on morphisms is called Cartesian product of morphisms. Second, consider the general product functor. For families  we should find a morphism  We choose the product of morphisms 

A category where every finite set of objects has a product is sometimes called a Cartesian category
(although some authors use this phrase to mean "a category with all finite limits").

The product is associative. Suppose  is a Cartesian category, product functors have been chosen as above, and  denotes a terminal object of  We then have natural isomorphisms

These properties are formally similar to those of a commutative monoid; a Cartesian category with its finite products is an example of a symmetric monoidal category.

Distributivity

For any objects  of a category with finite products and coproducts, there is a canonical morphism  where the plus sign here denotes the coproduct.  To see this, note that the universal property of the coproduct  guarantees the existence of unique arrows filling out the following diagram (the induced arrows are dashed):

The universal property of the product  then guarantees a unique morphism  induced by the dashed arrows in the above diagram.  A distributive category is one in which this morphism is actually an isomorphism.  Thus in a distributive category, there is the canonical isomorphism

See also

 Coproduct – the dual of the product
 Diagonal functor – the left adjoint of the product functor.

References

 
  Chapter 5.
 
 Definition 2.1.1 in

External links
 Interactive Web page  which generates examples of products in the category of finite sets. Written by Jocelyn Paine.
 

Limits (category theory)